The American University of Bahrain (abbreviated AUBH) is a private university situated in Riffa, Bahrain. Opened in September 2019 and licensed by the Higher Education Council of Bahrain, it is the first purpose-built American-model university in the country.

The university is governed by a board of trustees.

History and leadership
AUBH is the first comprehensive, purpose-built, American-model co-educational University in the Kingdom of Bahrain and is supported through the Mumtalakat portfolio.

AUBH is licensed by the Higher Education Council of the Ministry of Education of Bahrain,.

Dr. Bradley J. Cook is the current AUBH President. Dr. Jeff Zabudsky joined as Provost in June 2021. In June 2021, Dr. Jeffrey Zabudsky was appointed as AUBH Provost.

In November 2021, AUBH announced the finalization of an academic partnership with California State University, Northridge (CSUN), part of the largest university system in the U.S.: California State University. CSUN in the City of Los Angeles accredited by the Western Association of Schools and Colleges. This partnership is the first of its kind in the Kingdom of Bahrain.

Campus
The university's  campus is located in Bahrain's Southern Governorate, in Riffa. It was designed by US-based architects Ayers Saint Gross to accommodate up to 4,000 students and includes a library, four academic buildings each three storeys high, and an auditorium seating 250. The built-up area of campus totals ; there are 878 parking spaces.

Accreditation 
AUBH is licensed by the Higher Education Council of the Ministry of Education of Bahrain.

On June 3, 2021, a WSCUC panel reviewed the appropriate eligibility criteria and determined that the institution is eligible to proceed with an Application for Accreditation. The university is now seeking accreditation.

Colleges
The university offers programs within three colleges: Business and Management, Engineering, and Media & Design.

College of Media and Design
Bachelor of Arts in Multimedia Design
Master of Arts in Multimedia Management
College of Business and Management
Bachelor of Business Administration in Finance
Bachelor of Business Administration in Management
Bachelor of Business Administration in Digital Marketing & Social Media
Bachelor of Business Administration in Human Resources Management
Master of Business Administration
College of Engineering
Bachelor of Science in Computer Engineering
Bachelor of Science in Industrial Engineering
Bachelor of Science in Civil Engineering
Bachelor of Science in Computer Science
Bachelor of Science in Mechanical Engineering
Master of Science in Engineering Management

Gallery

References

Universities in Bahrain
2019 establishments in Bahrain